Murol is a commune in the French department of Puy-de-Dôme, Auvergne, France.

See also
Communes of the Puy-de-Dôme department

References

Communes of Puy-de-Dôme